Lady Jennifer is a 1915 British silent drama film directed by James Warry Vickers and starring Barbara Rutland and Harry Royston. The film was an adaptation of the 1908 novel of the same title by John Strange Winter.

Cast
 Barbara Rutland as Lady Jennifer  
 Harry Royston as Reeves

References

Bibliography
 Goble, Alan. The Complete Index to Literary Sources in Film. Walter de Gruyter, 1999.

External links

1915 films
1915 drama films
British drama films
British silent feature films
Films based on British novels
British black-and-white films
1910s English-language films
1910s British films
Silent drama films